842 Kerstin (prov. designation:  or ) is a dark background asteroid from the outer regions of the asteroid belt. It was discovered on 1 October 1916, by German astronomer Max Wolf at the Heidelberg-Königstuhl State Observatory in southwest Germany. Any reference of the origin of the asteroid's name is unknown.

Orbit and classification 

Kerstin is a non-family asteroid of the main belt's background population when applying the hierarchical clustering method to its proper orbital elements. It orbits the Sun in the outer main-belt at a distance of 2.9–3.6 AU once every 5 years and 10 months (2,127 days; semi-major axis of 3.24 AU). Its orbit has an eccentricity of 0.12 and an inclination of 14° with respect to the ecliptic. The body's observation arc begins at Heidelberg Observatory with its official discovery observation on 1 October 1916.

Naming 

"Kerstin" is a German feminine first name. Any reference of this name to a person or occurrence is unknown.

Unknown meaning 

Among the many thousands of named minor planets, Kerstin is one of 120 asteroids for which no official naming citation has been published.

Physical characteristics 

Kerstin is an assumed C-type asteroid, with a low astronomical albedo (see below) comparable to fresh asphalt.

Rotation period 

In 2018, Czech astronomers Josef Ďurech and Josef Hanuš published a modeled lightcurve using photometric data from the Gaia spacecraft's second data release. It showed a sidereal period of  hours, and gave a spin axis at (18.0°, 78.0°) in ecliptic coordinates (λ, β).

Diameter and albedo 

The Collaborative Asteroid Lightcurve Link assumes a standard albedo for a carbonaceous asteroid of 0.057 and calculates a diameter of 42.23 kilometers based on an absolute magnitude of 10.6.

References

External links 
 Lightcurve Database Query (LCDB), at www.minorplanet.info
 Dictionary of Minor Planet Names, Google books
 Asteroids and comets rotation curves, CdR – Geneva Observatory, Raoul Behrend
 Discovery Circumstances: Numbered Minor Planets (1)-(5000) – Minor Planet Center
 
 

000842
Discoveries by Max Wolf
Named minor planets
19161001